Jack Michael Meda (November 17, 1945 – September 22, 2019) was a boxer from British Columbia, Canada in the late 1960s  and early 1970s. In 1970, he won a bronze medal in the 1970 Commonwealth Games. He was born in New Westminster, British Columbia.

Boxing tournaments and teams

In 1967, Meda made his initial entry into the 1967 BC Golden Gloves tournament and was defeated by Seattle boxer Wesley Craven. After that first setback, Meda, under coach Harold Mann of Prince George's Spruce Capital Boxing Club, came back to win three Golden Glove heavyweight titles in British Columbia, and Canadian titles in 1970 and 1971.

Later life
Meda was inducted into the Prince George Sports Hall of Fame in 2003.

He died in Prince George at the age of 73 from a heart attack on September 22, 2019.

References

1945 births
2019 deaths
Commonwealth Games bronze medallists for Canada
Boxers at the 1970 British Commonwealth Games
Sportspeople from Prince George, British Columbia
Place of birth missing
Canadian male boxers
Commonwealth Games medallists in boxing
Heavyweight boxers
Medallists at the 1970 British Commonwealth Games